Martín Ezequiel Rose (born 31 May 1993) is an Argentine professional footballer who plays as a midfielder.

Career
Rose began his career with Los Andes from 2007, joining from Boca Juniors. After thirty-eight appearances in his first three campaigns, Rose netted his first senior goal in the club's 2013–14 Primera B Metropolitana final day encounter against UAI Urquiza. In January 2015, Rose completed a loan move to Flandria. Three goals in twenty-seven fixtures followed as they placed eleventh. He spent the subsequent 2016 season on loan with Defensores de Belgrano. On 1 September 2016, Rose left Los Andes permanently to sign for Comunicaciones. He played forty-one games and scored eight.

In 2018, Rose joined Liga Leumit side Hapoel Bnei Lod. He made just three appearances for the Israeli club, appearing in fixtures with Hapoel Petah Tikva, Hapoel Acre and, lastly, Maccabi Ahi Nazareth, who he scored against in a 1–2 defeat on 5 October. Rose returned to Argentina with former team Los Andes, now of Primera B Nacional, in January 2019. He appeared just once for them, in a defeat to Agropecuario on 16 February, before terminating his contract at the end of the season in June. In January 2020, Rose completed a move to Italian football with Eccellenza Sicily outfit Pro Favara.

In the succeeding October, Rose headed to Casalbordino of Eccellenza Abruzzo.

On 3 March 2021, he was signed by Eccellenza Sicily club Mazara. He then briefly played for Swiss amateurs AC Ravecchia in early 2022.

Career statistics
.

References

External links

1993 births
Living people
People from Lomas de Zamora
Argentine footballers
Association football midfielders
Argentine expatriate footballers
Expatriate footballers in Israel
Expatriate footballers in Italy
Argentine expatriate sportspeople in Israel
Argentine expatriate sportspeople in Italy
Primera B Metropolitana players
Liga Leumit players
Club Atlético Los Andes footballers
Flandria footballers
Defensores de Belgrano footballers
Club Comunicaciones footballers
Hapoel Bnei Lod F.C. players
Sportspeople from Buenos Aires Province